Voice (ヴォイス) is the seventh single released by the Japanese pop-rock band Porno Graffitti. It was released on October 17, 2001. It was certified as platinum single by the Recording Industry Association of Japan.

Track listing

References

2001 songs
Porno Graffitti songs
2001 singles